Spinach soup is a soup prepared using spinach as a primary ingredient. A common dish around the world, the soup can be prepared as a broth-based or cream-based soup, and the latter can be referred to as "cream of spinach soup." In China, a spinach and tofu soup is also known as "emerald and white jade soup"; spinach and tofu represent emerald and white jade respectively, and thus the spinach soup itself can be called "emerald soup". Fresh, canned or frozen spinach can be used, and the spinach can be used whole, puréed or chopped. Additional ingredients can include onion, green onion, carrot, celery, tomatoes, potatoes, lemon juice, olive oil, seasonings, salt and pepper. Spinach soup is typically served hot, but can also be served as a cold soup. Prior to being served, it can be topped or garnished with ingredients such as sour cream and crème fraîche.

Gallery

See also

 Cabbage soup
 List of cream soups
 List of vegetable soups
 List of soups
 Patriotic soup
 Sorrel soup
 Spinach dip
 Spinach salad
 Vegetable soup
 Watercress soup

References

External links

 Creamy spinach soup. BBC Good Food.

Vegetable soups
Spinach dishes